A status referendum was held on the island of Saba on 14 October 1994, alongside simultaneous referendums on Bonaire, Sint Eustatius and Sint Maarten. A majority voted for maintaining the status quo.

Result

See also
1994 Bonaire status referendum
1994 Sint Eustatius status referendum
1994 Sint Maarten status referendum

References

1994
1994
Independence referendums
1994 referendums
1994 in the Netherlands Antilles
October 1994 events in North America